Tutuala is a village and suco in the subdistrict of Tutuala (Lautém District, East Timor). It is situated at the extreme eastern end of Timor. Its population at the 2004 census was 3,707. The subdistrict of Tutuala comprises two sucos, including Mehara and Tutuala with the subdistrict administrator residing in Tutuala. The suco of Tutuala comprised four hamlets (aldeia): Ioro, Pitileti, Tchailoro, and Vero. The main Fataluku language areas of the country are in Tutuala, as well as Lautem and Fuiloro.

History

In Tutuala, 24 clans or ratu have been identified.  According to local tradition, the Tutuala ratu and Kati ratu clans originally spoke the Makuva language. All other clans in the district originated from outside Timor, bringing their own language with them during their migration. One clan has been identified as originating from southeastern Maluku.

Until World War II, the Lata people were settled in ancestral homes inside the forests, dependent upon the forests for their livelihoods. Many villages settled along the edges of the road or along the coast date to the period of Portuguese occupation, and after 1945 during the Indonesian occupation. Forested uplands in the Tutuala area were inhabited by the ratu or "clan groups" which included the walled and open settlements of Lata and also caves (veraka) which housed ancestral figures. According to Timorese legend, Fataluku people believe that "Jaco Island (Totina), near Titula, is identified by Fatalaku people as “the head of the land”, while the rest of the island constitutions the body".

Geography
Tutuala is bordered to the north by the Banda Sea, to the southeast by the Timor Sea and to the west by the suco of Mehara. The settlement of Muapitine is separated from Tutuala by the Vekase River. The road to Tutuala passes along the northern periphery of Lake Ira Lalaro and passes through the village of Mehara where Falalaku-style houses can be seen. During the rainy season this stretch of road is prone to flooding from rising lake waters.

Jaco Island, which also has fine beaches and is noted for its colourful anemone fish and sea turtles, is separated from Valu Beach by a narrow strait.

Tutuala is situated within the Nino Konis Santana National Park. Geographic features of importance include Lake Ira Lalaro and Mount Paitchau, as well as the caves of Léné Ara, Ile Kére Kére and O Hi.

Climate

Archaeology

The caves of Ile Kére Kére were excavated in 1966–1967, and numerous items such as stone tools and the bones of giant rats were unearthed, and some of the archaeological finds in the nearby caves of Lene Hara are carbon dated to 30,000 years ago. The caves also had cave paintings. Guerrilla fighters used these caves as hiding places during wartime. Excavations at the Lene Hara cave established occupation at least 30,000-35,000 years ago. Marine shells and stone artifacts have been dated to the Middle Paleolithic through Mesolithic era. In addition to artifact, painted rock art was also recorded at Lene Hara, in roof panels and stalagmite formations. The rock shelter site, Jerimalai, also located at the tip of the island, was occupied over 42,000 years ago; inhabitants, who left behind stone tools and shells, were noted to have eaten turtles, tuna, and rats.

Gallery

References

Bibliography

External links

Statoids.com

Populated places in East Timor
Lautém Municipality